Drosera longifolia L. is a rejected, ambiguous name that has been applied to two species of carnivorous plant:

Drosera anglica
Drosera intermedia